Katharine Juliet Ross (born January 29, 1940) is an American film, stage, and television actress. Her accolades include one  Academy Award nomination, one BAFTA Award, and two Golden Globe Awards. A native of Los Angeles, Ross spent most of her early life in the San Francisco Bay Area. After attending Santa Rosa Junior College for one year, Ross joined The Actors Workshop in San Francisco, and began appearing in theatrical productions.

Ross made her film debut in the Civil War-themed drama Shenandoah (1965), and had supporting parts in Mister Buddwing (1965) and The Singing Nun (1966) before being cast in Curtis Harrington's Games (1967), a thriller co-starring James Caan and Simone Signoret. At Signoret's recommendation, Ross was cast as Elaine Robinson in Mike Nichols' comedy-drama The Graduate (1967), which saw her receive significant critical acclaim, including an Academy Award nomination for Best Supporting Actress, a BAFTA nomination, and Golden Globe win for New Star of the Year. In 1968 Ross co-starred in the John Wayne movie Hellfighters playing his daughter Tish Buckman. She garnered further acclaim for her roles in two 1969 western films: Butch Cassidy and the Sundance Kid and Tell Them Willie Boy Is Here, for both of which she won the BAFTA Award for Best Actress.

In the 1970s, Ross had a leading role in the horror film The Stepford Wives (1975), for which she won the Saturn Award for Best Actress, and won her second Golden Globe Award for her performance in the drama Voyage of the Damned (1976). Other roles during this period included in disaster film The Swarm (1978), the supernatural horror film The Legacy (1978), and the science fiction film The Final Countdown (1980). Ross spent the majority of the 1980s appearing in a number of television films, including Murder in Texas (1981) and The Shadow Riders (1982), and later starred on the network series The Colbys from 1985 to 1987.

Ross spent the majority of the 1990s in semiretirement, although she returned to film with a supporting part in Richard Kelly's cult film Donnie Darko (2001). In 2016, she provided a voice role for the animated comedy series American Dad!, and the following year starred in the comedy-drama The Hero (2017), opposite her husband, Sam Elliott.

Early life

Ross was born in the Hollywood section of Los Angeles, California, on January 29, 1940, when her father, Dudley Tying Ross (1906–1991), was in the Navy. A native of New York, he had also worked for the Associated Press. Ross's mother, Katherine Mullen (1909–1993), was originally from Oklahoma and had lived in Indiana and Oregon before moving to San Francisco. She married Ross's father there in 1937. The family later settled in Walnut Creek.

Ross was a keen horse rider in her youth and was friends with rodeo rider Casey Tibbs. She graduated from Las Lomas High School in 1957. Ross studied for one year at Santa Rosa Junior College, where she was introduced to acting via a production of The King and I. She dropped out of the course and moved to San Francisco to study acting. 

Ross joined The Actors Workshop and was with them for three years. For one role in Jean Genet's The Balcony, she appeared nude on stage.

Career

In 1964, Ross was cast by John Houseman as Cordelia in a stage production of King Lear.

While at the Workshop, she began acting in television series in Los Angeles to earn extra money. She was brought to Hollywood by Metro, dropped, then picked up by Universal.

Ross auditioned but was not hired for a role in the film West Side Story (1961). Her first television role was in Sam Benedict in 1962.

She was signed by agent Wally Hiller, and in 1964, Ross appeared in episodes of Kraft Suspense Theatre, The Lieutenant, Arrest and Trial, The Virginian, The Great Adventure, Ben Casey, Mr. Novak, Wagon Train, Bob Hope Presents the Chrysler Theatre, Run for Your Life, Gunsmoke, and The Alfred Hitchcock Hour ("Dividing Wall", 1963) as well as playing the love interest of Heath Barkley opposite Lee Majors on The Big Valley (Season 1, Episode 7-"Winner Loses All"). She screen tested for The Young Lovers."

Ross made her first film, Shenandoah in 1965 playing the daughter-in-law of James Stewart.  She returned to guest starring on shows like The Loner, The Wild Wild West, and The Road West. MGM put her in an unsold TV pilot about Bible stories. She signed a long term deal with Universal, who called her an "American Samantha Eggar", despite some misgivings: "I didn't want a contract in the movies but a lot of people convinced me it was a good thing to do."

MGM borrowed her for supporting parts in The Singing Nun (1966) and Mister Buddwing (1966).

Mainstream breakthrough

At Universal, Ross starred in a television film with Doug McClure, The Longest Hundred Miles (1967), then co-starred in Curtis Harrington's psychological thriller, Games (1967) with Simone Signoret and James Caan, which she later called "terrible". 

Ross's breakthrough role was as Elaine Robinson in Mike Nichols's comedy-drama The Graduate (1967), opposite Dustin Hoffman and Anne Bancroft. Ross was only eight years younger than Bancroft who played her mother in the film. She had been recommended to director Nichols by Signoret. This part, in which Ross plays a young woman who elopes with a young man who had an affair with her mother, earned Ross an Oscar nomination for Best Supporting Actress, and won her a Golden Globe Award as New Star of the Year. Commenting on her critical accolades at the time, Ross said, "I'm not a movie star... that system is dying and I'd like to help it along."

She later said at this time "I got sent everything in town but Universal wouldn't loan me out." After eight months she was in Hellfighters (1968) playing  John Wayne's daughter who romances Jim Hutton.

Ross was cast as a Native American woman in Universal's western film Tell Them Willie Boy Is Here (1969), starring Robert Redford. In August 1968, she signed a new contract with Universal to make two films a year for seven years. She refused several roles (including Jacqueline Bisset's role in Bullitt) before accepting the part of Etta Place in Butch Cassidy and the Sundance Kid (1969), co-starring Paul Newman and Robert Redford, which was another massive commercial hit. She was paid $175,000 for her performance in the film. For her roles in both Tell Them Willie Boy is Here and Butch Cassidy and the Sundance Kid, Ross won the BAFTA Award for Best Actress.

She was dropped by Universal in the spring of 1969 for refusing to play a stewardess in Airport starring Burt Lancaster and Dean Martin, another role that went to Jacqueline Bisset. Ross eventually got out of her Universal contract, which, however meant later on she lost out to Tuesday Weld on a film she greatly desired to do, an adaptation of Play It as It Lays, because it was a Universal production. Instead, she had a starring role in the drama Fools (1970) opposite Jason Robards.

Semi-retirement and comeback
Ross dropped out of Hollywood for a while after marrying cinematographer Conrad Hall. She occasionally acted, appearing in Get to Know Your Rabbit (1972), They Only Kill Their Masters (1972) with James Garner, and Chance and Violence (1974) with Yves Montand. She refused several more roles, including a part in The Towering Inferno.

Preferring stage acting, Ross returned to the small playhouses in Los Angeles for much of the 1970s. "I'm aware that I have the reputation for being difficult," she later said.

One of her best-known roles came in 1975's film The Stepford Wives, for which she replaced Tuesday Weld at the last moment and won the Saturn Award for Best Actress.

She reprised the role of Etta Place in a 1976 ABC television film, Wanted: The Sundance Woman, a sequel to Butch Cassidy and the Sundance Kid. Ross subsequently appeared in the drama film Voyage of the Damned (1977) about a doomed ocean liner carrying Jewish refugees from Nazi Germany, which earned her her second Golden Globe Award for Best Supporting Actress. She was also in The Betsy (1978) and the disaster film The Swarm (1978). Next, Ross co-starred opposite Sam Elliott in the supernatural horror film The Legacy (1978), playing a woman who finds herself subject to an ancestral curse at an English estate. Ross had previously worked with Elliott on Butch Cassidy and the Sundance Kid.

Television
From 1979 Ross starred in several television movies, including Murder by Natural Causes in 1979 with Hal Holbrook, Barry Bostwick and Richard Anderson, Rodeo Girl in 1980, Murder in Texas (1981) and Marian Rose White (1982).  She had a supporting role in The Final Countdown (1980) and Wrong Is Right (1982) but focused largely on television films: The Shadow Riders (1982), a remake of Wait Until Dark (1983), Travis McGee (1982) with Elliott, Secrets of a Mother and Daughter (1983), Red Headed Stranger (1986), and Houston: The Legend of Texas (1986) with Elliott.

She had a role in the 1980s television series The Colbys opposite Charlton Heston as Francesca Scott Colby, mother of Dynasty crossover character Jeff Colby.

Later career
Ross co-wrote the teleplay and starred in Conagher (1991) alongside husband Sam Elliott and was in A Climate for Killing (1991), and Home Before Dark (1997).

She played Donnie's therapist in the 2001 cult classic Donnie Darko. She was in Don't Let Go (2002), and Capital City (2004) and played Carly Schroeder's grandmother in the 2006 independent film Eye of the Dolphin. She was also in Slip, Tumble & Slide (2015).

In January 2015 she appeared at the Malibu Playhouse in the first of a series titled A Conversation With, interviewed by Steven Gaydos. That February, she again co-starred with Sam Elliott in Love Letters, also at the Malibu Playhouse.

In 2017, she appeared as Sam Elliott's former wife in The Hero, in which he played an aging Western star.

Personal life
Ross has married five times. In 1960, she married her college sweetheart, Joel Fabiani, though the marriage lasted only two years before ending in divorce.

She married her second husband John Marion in 1964 but they were divorced in 1967.

After completing Butch Cassidy and the Sundance Kid, Ross married the film's cinematographer, three-time Oscar-winner Conrad Hall, in 1969. They divorced in 1973.

She married Gaetano "Tom" Lisi in 1974 after making The Stepford Wives; they met when he was a chauffeur and technician on the set. They divorced in 1979.

Ross married Sam Elliott in 1984. They were co-stars in the supernatural horror film The Legacy (1978). They had worked together on Butch Cassidy and the Sundance Kid, and after they were reacquainted on the set of The Legacy'' they began dating, and married in May 1984, four months before the birth of their daughter Cleo Rose Elliott.

Filmography

Accolades

Notes

References

Sources

External links

 
 Katharine Ross at TCM

1940 births
20th-century American actresses
21st-century American actresses
Actresses from Hollywood, Los Angeles
American children's writers
American film actresses
American stage actresses
American television actresses
Best Actress BAFTA Award winners
Best Supporting Actress Golden Globe (film) winners
Living people
New Star of the Year (Actress) Golden Globe winners
People from Malibu, California
People from Walnut Creek, California
Age controversies